Tobias Schopf (born 25 December 1985) is an Austrian handball player for UHK Krems and the Austrian national team.

He participated at the 2018 European Men's Handball Championship.

References

1985 births
Living people
People from Eggenburg
Austrian male handball players
Sportspeople from Lower Austria